New York held various elections on November 7, 2006. The senatorial and gubernatorial elections were two of the most lopsided elections in New York statewide election history.

Former Attorney General Eliot Spitzer won the 2006 election but announced his resignation on March 11, 2008, from the position of governor due to his involvement in a prostitution ring. He was elected by a large margin in 2006. Both U.S. Senators are Democrats, Chuck Schumer and Kirsten Gillibrand. The previous governor was a Republican, George Pataki, who defeated incumbent Democrat Mario Cuomo in 1994 and was re-elected twice by wide margins. Republican Senator Alfonse D'Amato served until he was defeated in 1998 and before him long-time Senator Jacob Javits also served as a Republican, although he ran as a Liberal in 1980. Republican Congressmen William E. Miller and Jack Kemp were both from New York and were running mates for Barry Goldwater in 1964 and Bob Dole in 1996 respectively (though Kemp's appearance on the ballot occurred after his service in Congress). Despite the strong Democratic presence in New York City, Republican Rudolph Giuliani served two terms as mayor in the 1990s, and Michael Bloomberg was elected as a Republican twice, the first time being in 2001 and then again in 2005. He became an independent to be narrowly re-elected to his third and final term in 2009. However, in 2013, Democrat Bill de Blasio won back the mayoralty of New York City for his party with over 73% of the vote.

In 2006, Democrats made gains across the state, building on their existing majority. While Democrats had already been a strong force in the New York City area, most of the Democratic gains in 2006 occurred upstate. Democrat Eliot Spitzer won a landslide victory to replace George Pataki as governor, defeating John Faso 69-29%—the second-largest victory for a statewide candidate in New York history. Democrats Hillary Clinton, Andrew Cuomo and Alan Hevesi won the US Senate, Attorney General and State Comptroller races by wide margins respectively. For the first time in over 60 years, all major statewide elected offices are held by Democrats.

Republicans kept control of the State Senate, but lost the seat of Republican Nicholas Spano in Westchester County, and lost a Long Island seat in a 2007 special election, and an upstate seat in 2008. Democrats also gained three seats to build on their supermajority in the State Assembly. Republicans did gain a seat in the Assembly in 2007 in a special election in Upstate New York.

Democrats also won three Republican held congressional seats, all in Upstate New York. Democrat Michael Arcuri won the open seat of retiring Republican Sherwood Boehlert in the 24th Congressional District, which stretches across Central New York from Utica to Oneonta to the Finger Lakes. Democrat Kirsten Gillibrand defeated Republican incumbent John Sweeney in the 20th Congressional District, which includes Saratoga Springs and Glens Falls and takes in most of the upper Hudson Valley. Democrat John Hall defeated Republican incumbent Sue Kelly in the 19th Congressional district in the Lower Hudson Valley outside New York City. Of the nine Republican incumbents up for reelection in 2006, only one, John McHugh in the 23rd district (the far northern region of the state) won reelection with over 60% of the vote. Republicans James Walsh of Syracuse, Tom Reynolds of Clarence and Randy Kuhl of Bath all won re-election by narrow margins.

Federal

United States Senate

Democratic Senator Hillary Clinton was re-elected to a 2nd 6-year term. She was first elected in 2000.

United States House

State

Governor

Eliot Spitzer, a Democrat, was elected to replace retiring George Pataki, a Republican.

Attorney General

Andrew Cuomo was elected to replace fellow Democrat Eliot Spitzer, who was elected governor.

Comptroller

Democratic Comptroller Alan Hevesi was re-elected. He then resigned.

State Senate

State Assembly

Local

See also
New York gubernatorial elections
New York state elections

2006

New York